Scott Richard Wolf (born June 4, 1968) is an American actor. He is known for his roles in the television series Party of Five as Bailey Salinger, as Jake Hartman in Everwood, as Chad Decker in V and as Carson Drew in Nancy Drew. In film, he is best known for the cult classics Go and Double Dragon.

Early life
Wolf was born in Boston, Massachusetts. He is the son of Susan (née Levy) and Steven Wolf, a health care executive. Wolf was raised in a Reform Jewish family. He grew up in West Orange, New Jersey, and graduated in 1986 from West Orange High School. His cousin is comedian and scriptwriter Josh Wolf.

Wolf attended George Washington University and received a Bachelor of Arts degree in finance in 1991. He also became a Brother of the Alpha Epsilon Pi Fraternity.

Career
Wolf is known for his role as Bailey Salinger on Party of Five. On both Everwood and the short-lived The Nine, he portrayed a doctor; and he portrayed Dr. Scott Clemmens on NBC's The Night Shift. He made guest appearances as himself on Action and Kids Inc. His sole Broadway theatre credit to date is Side Man. He has also made a few brief appearances on Voltron: Legendary Defender, as Rax, a Balmeran.

In 2019, Wolf was cast in the lead role of Carson Drew in the The CW drama series Nancy Drew. He took over the role from Freddie Prinze Jr., who played the character in the original unaired pilot episode.

Personal life
Wolf was engaged to Alyssa Milano in 1993, but they separated after a year and a half. In 2002, he began dating Kelley Marie Limp, an alumna of MTV's The Real World: New Orleans, after meeting her in New York City through a mutual friend. They married on May 29, 2004, before temporarily living in Santa Monica, California. They have three children – sons born in February 2009 and November 2012; and a daughter born in 2014. The family resides in Vancouver in western Canada.

Filmography

Film

Television films

Television series

References

External links

 
 Scott Wolf cast bio on The WB

1968 births
Male actors from New Jersey
American male film actors
American male television actors
American male voice actors
George Washington University School of Business alumni
Jewish American male actors
Living people
Male actors from Boston
People from West Orange, New Jersey
West Orange High School (New Jersey) alumni
20th-century American male actors
21st-century American male actors